Gizmo Varillas (born Guillermo Varillas Kortabarria on 9 January 1990) is a Spanish-British songwriter, musician and record producer currently living in Brighton. He was born in Spain and raised in Wales.

Music career & collaborations 

In 2016, Varillas played all the instruments, engineered, arranged, produced and wrote each song on his debut album. He then sampled John Lennon on his song "No War" after getting permission from Yoko Ono. The dialogue is taken from an interview with Lennon, aired on BBC 2 as part of the arts program "Release" on 6 June 1968.

In 2017, Varillas released his debut studio album El Dorado, which was named one of the top 10 albums of the year by Classic Pop magazine. The title track El Dorado was featured in Cafe Del Mar XXV Compilation album.

In 2018, Varillas' song "Losing You" from his second album Dreaming of Better Days was a response to the Orlando nightclub shooting. It was chosen as best song of 2018 by Songpickr.

In 2019, Varillas' song "Losing You" was remixed by Baio from Vampire Weekend and it was featured on the FIFA 19 soundtrack. His song "Fever, Fever" was featured on the Netflix series Special in 2019.

In 2020, Varillas worked with legendary Afrobeat drummer Tony Allen on his single Saving Grace, they recorded together at RAK Studios in London. The music video was premiered and featured by The Independent and Varillas was chosen by music correspondent Roisin O'Connor as her spotlight artist. In an interview with the newspaper, he said that he wrote Saving Grace as a homage to music. Throughout the toughest times in his life, music has always been one of the few things he could count on to lift him back up. Rolling Stone chose his song ‘Give a Little Love’ from his album El Dorado as their #1 most beautiful undiscovered 2020 summer hit of the moment. They also named the whole album as the perfect summer playlist.

In 2021, Varillas collaborated with Calexico (band) member Sergio Mendoza Y La Orkesta on his song A La Vida. In the same year, Varillas co-wrote the song 'Calling Me Back to You' with Jack Savoretti. The song was part of Savoretti's album 'Europiana' which made it to number 1 on the official UK album charts.

In 2022, Varillas worked with Grammy award-winning producer and engineer Noah Georgeson on his song 'A New Dawn'. In the same year, Varillas composed the music for the BBC documentary Transfer: The Fate of Emiliano Sala  and the podcast Transfer: The Emiliano Sala Story about the mysterious disappearance and death of Argentine professional footballer Emiliano Sala. Varillas' song Freedom For A Change was also part of the Netflix original film I Used To Be Famous (2022) soundtrack.

Live performances

During his live appearances, Varillas opened for Brazilian musician Seu Jorge, Mexican guitarists Rodrigo y Gabriela, Latin singer Natalia Lafourcade, Julieta Venegas, French singer Zaz, and Italian singer-songwriter Jack Savoretti across Europe. He also played at Zermatt Unplugged in 2019, The Great Escape Festival in 2018, Latitude Festival in 2018, and Montreux Jazz Festival in 2017. He was named Artist of the Month by Cafe Nero, and one of top 10 artists at Eurosonic Festival by leading Dutch music site 3VOOR12.

Charity

In 2019, Varillas worked alongside Movember where he donated half of the profits of his cover of I Put A Spell On You by Screamin' Jay Hawkins to Movember projects that tackle mental health, suicide prevention, prostate cancer and testicular cancer.

Discography

Studio albums
El Dorado (2017)
Dreaming of Better Days (2018)
Out of the Darkness (2020)

References

External links

1990 births
Living people
Spanish expatriates in the United Kingdom
Spanish male singer-songwriters
Spanish singer-songwriters
21st-century Spanish singers
21st-century Spanish male singers
English-language singers from Spain